Peter Kaberere (died 6 April 2014) was a Kenyan singer mostly in Swahili Pop and Zouk and contemporary gospel music. Kaberere also known as Qabbz after his surname began career with the music group Jogg C which had  Lena Ochieng and Nuvine  as members and  merged with Gospel Fathers to  form Zaidi Ya Mziki. He later  launched a solo musical career. He released the album Kiburi that produced the hit "Kiburi  Famous hits include "Nisamehe" and has collaborated with Mr Vee in the song "Just a Way". He also featured in "Mwanake" by Benachi. Kaberere and  worked as Logistics/Operations Manager at Mo Sound Events, the company that hosts the Annual Gospel Awards Groove Awards and the Safaricom Live concerts.

He was electrocuted at his own car wash. He was married to Njesh Wa Qabbz and had a son and was expecting his second child, a daughter born just hours after his burial at the Langata cemetery.

References

2014 deaths
Year of birth missing
21st-century Kenyan male singers